Namgyal Monastery (also often referred to as "Dalai Lama's Temple") is currently located in Mcleod Ganj, Dharamsala, India. It is the personal monastery of the 14th Dalai Lama. Another name for this temple-complex is Namgyal Tantric College.

This monastery key  role is to assist with rituals involving the Dalai Lama of Tibet.  Its main tantric practices reportedly include those of Kalachakra, Yamantaka, Chakrasamvara, Guhyasamaja, and Vajrakilaya.

Early years

Founded in either 1564 or 1565 as Phende Lekshe Ling (on the foundations of the since defunct monastery called Phende Gon) by the second Dalai Lam Gendun Gyatso, Namgyal Monastery was renamed in honour of the female long-life deity Namgyälma in 1571.

Since the completion of construction on the Potala Palace (begun by the Fifth Dalai Lama), Namgyal was traditionally housed in the red section at the top of that building in Lhasa.

Since 1959

Following the Tibetan uprising of 1959, Namgyal Monastery relocated to Dharamshala, India, where it continues, active, to this day.  According to Namgyal's website, Namgyal (Dharamshala) has "nearly 200" monks (up from 55 in 1959), representing all four main Tibetan monastic lineages.

In 1992, on the advice of the present Dalai Lama, Namgyal established an American branch in Ithaca, New York, including within it the Namgyal Monastery Institute of Buddhist Studies.  On 8 February 1996, the monks of Namgyal Monastery's Institute of Buddhist Studies offered their first "Blessing of Cyberspace" as part of the "Twenty-four Hours in Cyberspace" event.

In 1998, Namgyal incorporated a Tibetan monastery in Bodhgaya, India, called Gendhen Phelgyeling. That monastery is now known as Namgyal (Bodhgaya), and has 45 monks.

Namgyal (Dharamsala) also manages a temple in Kushinagar (since 1967), and an elderly home in Simla (since 1992).

Whether the People's Republic of China has maintained an institution with the same name inside Tibet is unclear.

See also
Dalai Lama lineage
Third Dalai Lama: founder of Namgyal Monastery
Fifth Dalai Lama: builder of the Potala
Fourteenth Dalai Lama: current Dalai Lama
Losang Samten: contemporary historian of Namgyal Monastery

References

External links

Namgyal (Dharamshala) - The home monastery in Mcleod Ganj, India
Namgyal (Bodh Gaya) - Gendhen Phelgyeling branch in Bodh Gaya, India
Namgyal (Ithaca) - Institute of Buddhist Studies branch in Ithaca, New York, USA

Buddhist monasteries in Tibet
1575 establishments in Asia
Religious organizations established in the 1570s
Gelug monasteries
Tibetan Buddhist monasteries and temples in India
Buildings and structures in Dharamshala
14th Dalai Lama